HMS D5 was one of eight D-class submarines built for the Royal Navy during the first decade of the 20th century.

Description
The D-class submarines were designed as improved and enlarged versions of the preceding C class, with diesel engines replacing the dangerous petrol engines used earlier. D3 and subsequent boats were slightly larger than the earlier boats. They displaced  on the surface and  submerged. The D-class submarines had a crew of 25 officers and ratings and were the first to adopt saddle tanks.

For surface running, the boats were powered by two  diesels, each driving one propeller shaft. When submerged each propeller was driven by a  electric motor. They could reach  on the surface and  underwater.

The boats were armed with three 18-inch (45 cm) torpedo tubes, two in the bow and one in the stern. They carried one reload for each tube, a total of six torpedoes.

Construction and career
D5 was one of six D-class submarines ordered from Vickers Armstrong under the 1909–1910 Naval Estimates and was laid down at Vickers' Barrow-in-Furness shipyard on 23 February 1910. She was launched on 28 August 1911 and completed on 19 January 1912.

On the outbreak of the First World War, D5, along with the rest of her class, was assigned to the 8th Submarine Flotilla. The Flotilla, including D5 was assigned to patrol in the east end of the English Channel during the passage of the British Expeditionary Force to France in early August. On 21 August 1914, D5 was on patrol west of Heligoland when she spotted a force of German warships that were carrying out a sortie into the North Sea against British fishing vessels. D5 fired two torpedoes at the German light cruiser , both of which missed.

Wreck 
There were only five survivors, including her commanding officer, Lieutenant Commander Godfrey Herbert.

In 2016 Historic England commissioned an investigation of the wreck site by Wessex Archaeology as part of Archaeological Services in Relation to Marine Protection, a two-year project to assess a selection of underwater sites around the English coast. The investigation involved a geophysical survey over the location of the wreck site followed by a diver survey, which found that whilst the wreck of D5 meets the criteria for designation, it is sufficiently buried as to not be at risk. The decision was ultimately made not to designate the wreck at that time.

Notes

References
 
 
 Croce, Paulo (January 2016) HMS D5 off Lowestoft, Suffolk: Archaeological Services in Relation to Marine Protection, Undesignated Site Assessment, Wessex Archaeology.

External links
 MaritimeQuest HMS D-5 Pages
 HMS D-5 Roll of Honour
 'Submarine losses 1904 to present day' - Royal Navy Submarine Museum 
 Historic England project to research First World War Submarine wrecks 

 

British D-class submarines
Royal Navy ship names
Ships built in Barrow-in-Furness
World War I shipwrecks in the North Sea
British submarine accidents
Maritime incidents in November 1914
1911 ships
Ships sunk by mines
Lost submarines of the United Kingdom
Protected Wrecks of the United Kingdom